The Distances from Everyone to You is Louis XIV's 2nd EP.  It was released on September 11, 2007.

Track listing
"There's a Traitor in This Room" – 3:37
"Your Shoes Are the Star of the Show" – 3:06
"The Distances from Everyone to You" – 5:08
"Flash's Theme" (Bonus track) – 4:19

Louis XIV (band) albums